Katarina Čas (born 23 September 1976) is a  Slovenian actress.

Early life
Čas was born in Slovenj Gradec, Slovenia, then part of Yugoslavia. Cas is the daughter of Miran Čas (July 22, 1952, Slovenj Gradec - February 23, 2015, Ljubljana), a forester by profession, and his wife Aleksandra. She has a younger sister, Vita Čas.

She attended Bežigrad Grammar School in Ljubljana and continued her studies at the Faculty of Economics at the University of Ljubljana, graduating with a degree in marketing communication.

Career
Her first appearance on television was a 1988 commercial for the Slovene soft drink company carbonated Cockta, directed by Jaka Judnič. Her first movie was the 1989 Slovene youth film Peklenski načrt (The Infernal Plan). She started to appear on TV more often from 1997, as a host of music program for younger generations called Atlantis which was broadcast on Kanal A. Since 2005 she has hosted a music program called Aritmija on RTV Slovenija. Her international career began with the role of Gabriella in the 2011 Irish movie The Guard by John Michael McDonagh. Her most prominent role so far was 2013 film The Wolf of Wall Street, in which she portrayed Chantalle. Later, she portrayed Sophie in the 2015 film Danny Collins opposite Al Pacino.

Filmography

Film

Television

References

External links
 
 Prepisani production Vest
 Pod sretnom zvijezdom production Nova TV

Slovenian television actresses
1976 births
Living people
Slovenian film actresses
Slovenian television personalities
20th-century Slovenian actresses
21st-century Slovenian actresses
People from Slovenj Gradec
University of Ljubljana alumni